Karen Drogin (born July 7, 1965), known professionally by the pen name Carly Phillips, is an American author and former attorney. Phillips has written twenty-three romance novels.

Awards
Waldenbooks Bestselling Author Award
Oklahoma Romance Writers of America National Readers' Choice Award
Virginia Romance Writers of America's Holt Medallion
Greater Detroit Romance Writers of America Booksellers' Best
Dorothy Parker Award for Excellence

Bibliography

Simply series
Simply Sinful (2000)
Simply Scandalous (2000)
Simply Sensual (2001)
Body Heat (2001)
Simply Sexy (2002)

Hot zone series
Hot Stuff (2004)
Hot Number (2005)
Hot Item (2006)
Hot Property (June 24, 2008) (last of the "Hot Zone" Series)

Stand alone novels
Brazen (1999)
Secret Fantasy (2001)
Erotic Invitation (2001)
Seduce Me (2008) (reprint of Erotic Invitation)

Corwin curse series
Lucky Charm (October 2008)
Lucky Streak (June 2009)
Lucky Break (September 2009)

Costas sister series
Under the Boardwalk (2004)
Summer Lovin''' (2005)

Ty & Hunter seriesCross My Heart (2006)Sealed With A Kiss (2007)

Chandler brothers seriesThe Bachelor (2002)The Playboy (2003)The Heartbreaker (2003)

Written As Karen DroginPerfect Partners (1999)The Right Choice (2000)Solitary Man (2000)

The Bachelor Blog Series
Kiss Me If You Can ( 2010)
Love Me If You Dare (2010)

Serendipity
Serendipity (2011) 
Destiny (2012)
Karma (2012)
Kismet (novella)

Dare to Love Series
Dare to Love (2013)
Dare to Desire (2014)
Dare to Surrender (2014)(New York Dare Cousin's)
Dare to Submit   (2014)(New York Dared Cousin's)
Dare to Touch (2015)
Dare to Hold (2015)
Dare to Rock (2015)
Dare to Seduce (2015)(New York Dare Cousin's)
Dare to Take (May 3, 2016 on Google Play

UNRELEASED
Dare to Want
Dare to Pleasure
Dare to Dream

OmnibusNaughty or Nice? (2001) (with Sherrilyn Kenyon, Patricia Ryan and Kathryn Smith)Invitations to Seduction (2003) (with Janelle Denison and Vicki Lewis Thompson)Stroke of Midnight (2004) (with Jacquie D'Alessandro, Janelle Denison)Skin Tight / Hot Number (2005) (with Susan Andersen)Undone: Going All the Way / Her Secret Thrill / Good Time Girl (2005) (with Donna Kauffman and Candace Schuler)Santa, Baby'' (2006) (with Jennifer Cruise, Lori Foster)

Internet meme
Starting in 2011 an internet meme featuring a picture of Phillips spread online called the Sheltering Suburban Mom; the captions on the image typically illustrated the perceived out-of-touch double standards suburban mothers hold against their children or their peers. Phillips herself was initially unaware of the meme itself; when it was first brought to her attention she claims to have been distressed, thinking it was about herself, not the archetype; she came to understand the joke now and claims she is nothing like the supposed suburban mothers.

References

External links
Carly Phillips Official Website

1965 births
Living people
American romantic fiction writers
20th-century American novelists
21st-century American novelists
20th-century American women writers
21st-century American women writers
20th-century pseudonymous writers
21st-century pseudonymous writers
Pseudonymous women writers